The tallest object on the downtown skyline of Lynchburg, Virginia, Court Street Baptist Church stands as a testament to the black Baptist population of Lynchburg. Organized in 1843, the congregation—originally known as the African Baptist Church of Lynchburg—was the first of its kind in the city. The church was designed by R.C. Burkholder, and completed in 1880.

References

External links

 Court Street Baptist Church, Court & Sixth Streets, Lynchburg, VA: 1 photo, 1 data page, and 1 photo caption page, at Historic American Buildings Survey

African-American history of Virginia
Historic American Buildings Survey in Virginia
Churches on the National Register of Historic Places in Virginia
Churches completed in 1880
19th-century Baptist churches in the United States
Churches in Lynchburg, Virginia
National Register of Historic Places in Lynchburg, Virginia